"Nothing but Your Love Matters" is a song written by Larry Gatlin, and recorded by American country music group Larry Gatlin & the Gatlin Brothers.  It was released in January 1986 as the second single from the album Smile.  The song reached number 12 on the Billboard Hot Country Singles & Tracks chart.

Chart performance

References

1986 singles
1986 songs
Larry Gatlin songs
Song recordings produced by Chips Moman
Columbia Records singles
Songs written by Larry Gatlin